Diana Akhmetova (born ) is a Russian weightlifter, who competed in the 63 kg category and represented Russia at international competitions.

She won the silver medal at the 2010 Summer Youth Olympics, was 2011 Youth World Champion, and lifted 237 kg to become 2012 Junior World Champion. She became the Russian Weightlifting Champion in the 63 kg class in 2013.  She participated at the 2016 European Weightlifting Championships.

Major results

References

External links
Profile at LSI Results
Profile at thesports.org

1994 births
Living people
Russian female weightlifters
Place of birth missing (living people)
Weightlifters at the 2010 Summer Youth Olympics
21st-century Russian women